Ski jumping at the 1988 Winter Olympics consisted of three events held from 14 February to 24 February, taking place at Canada Olympic Park. The Calgary Games featured the addition of a new event, the first program change since 1964, with the debut of the team event. Britain's Eddie "The Eagle" Edwards achieved celebrity by finishing last in both individual events, with less than half the points of the second-last competitor.

Medal summary

Medal table

Finland led the medal table, winning all three gold medals, Matti Nykänen taking both individual events and helping the Finnish team to victory. Given that this was the first year in which there were three ski jumping event, this made Nykänen the most successful ski jumper in a single Games.

The two medals for Yugoslavia were the only ones that country would win in ski jumping (though Slovenia, where all four Yugoslavian team members were from, would win its first as an independent country in 2002).

Events

Participating NOCs
Nineteen nations participated in ski jumping at the Calgary Games. Great Britain made their Olympic ski jumping debut, with Eddie "The Eagle" Edwards their sole participant.

References

 
1988 Winter Olympics events
1988
1988 in ski jumping
Ski jumping competitions in Canada